Boy Girl Dog Cat Mouse Cheese (French: Boy Girl, etc.) is an animated television series based on an original concept by Jeff Harter and Cloudco Entertainment, and directed by Jérémy Guiter  for Season 1 and Matthieu Giner for Season 2. The series is an American-French-Irish co-production between Cloudco Entertainment, WatchNext Media, and Kavaleer Productions, and produced with the participation of Gulli, Canal J, BBC, RTÉ and De Agostini Editore S.p.A. The show originally premiered in the United Kingdom on CBBC on October 31, 2019.

The show centers around a boy, a girl, a dog, a cat, a mouse, and a piece of cheese, all respectively named after what they are, who live together. In June 2019, the series was renewed for a second season, ahead of the series premiere. On July 28, 2022, it was confirmed that the series has been renewed for a third season, with production being greenlit as well. 

Boy Girl Dog Cat Mouse Cheese was nominated in the 'Best Animated Kids Series 6+' and 'Best Music' categories at the Irish Animation Awards in 2021, with Baljeet Rai and Henry Gifford nominated for the 'Best Writer' award for the episode Neighborhood Watchdog.

Characters

Main 
 Boy (voiced by Justin Michael) is an anxious and expressive teenage boy. He is the oldest and tries to be the most mature of the group, but finds himself at odds with his unique siblings. He also likes bobbleheads and hanging out with his five other siblings.
 Girl (voiced by Alyson Leigh Rosenfeld) is a rambunctious, rebellious teenage girl. She is close to Boy, but challenges his authority.
 Dog (voiced by Justin Anselmi) is a male German Shepherd/Jack Russell Terrier mix, according to concept art. He is athletic and active, with a slight streak of immaturity. As he is very obedient, he often has trouble refusing orders, especially from Boy.
 Cat (voiced by Erica Schroeder) is a female Turkish van who behaves bizarrely and possesses unique abilities. Apart from the episode “Confession Cat”, she rarely speaks.
 Mouse (voiced by Abe Goldfarb) is a male mouse. He is intelligent and rational, but often makes really crazy and irrational machines as ways to solve problems.
 Cheese (voiced by Erica Schroeder) is a female anthropomorphic piece of limburger cheese. She is very dramatic and is a diva who enjoys singing, throwing parties and writing fantasy novels.
Many episodes feature minor or one-time characters with voices provided by H.D. Quinn, Laurie Hymes, Samantha Cooper, Ryan Nicolls, Samara Naeymi, Cristina Pitter and Serra Hirsch. Theresa Buchheister was the sole voice director for the English language cast in season 1; Harry Chaskin began directing in season 2.

Production 
Boy Girl Dog Cat Mouse Cheese is produced by Cloudco Entertainment in the United States, WatchNext Media in France, and Kavaleer Productions in Ireland. The series is aimed towards children between the ages of 6 and 12. Sophie Yates from Bulldog Licensing explains that “Boy Girl Dog Cat Mouse Cheese brings together today's kids and tweens, and tackles the topic of blended families with humor and fun."

The series was known to have been in production since 2006, and was intended to be made for Cartoon Network. In 2011, Cloudco first filed a trademark for its title. Originally it was to be produced by Cloudco Entertainment along with Mercury Filmworks in Canada, as per an agreement by the Writers' Guild of Canada. The trademark expired in 2014 and was renewed, with Disney XD and Teletoon as the networks intending to air the series as of 2015, but it expired again in 2017.

The first season was produced between September 26, 2018 and February 8, 2020.
In June 2019, the series was renewed for a second season. The production of season 2 began in July 2020, with production wrapping up on December 17, 2021.

The show was renewed for a third series on 6 July 2022.

Episodes

Season 1 (2019–2020)

Season 2 (2022)

Broadcast 
Boy Girl Dog Cat Mouse Cheese premiered on CBBC in the United Kingdom on 31 October 2019, and daily episode premieres continued 19 November. On 6 January 2020, the series initially premiered on Family Channel in Canada, but was moved to Family Chrgd in the fall of 2021. On 15 June 2020, the second part of series 1 premiered on CBBC in the United Kingdom. It premiered in France on Gulli on 23 March 2020 and on Canal J on 1 January 2021. Episodes of the series are broadcast on some international channels of Disney Channel, its sister channel Disney XD and Cartoon Network.

On 12 June 2021, Finnish channel Yle TV2 began broadcasting the series during the “Galaxi” programming block and as of 9 July 2021, SIC K has been broadcasting the series dubbed into European Portuguese.

In April 2022, HBO Max Latinoamérica announced via social media that Boy Girl Dog Cat Mouse Cheese would be added to their platform for broadcast across Latin America, with a Spanish-language dub. The series was added on 22 April 2022, along with a Brazilian Portuguese dub in addition to the Latin American Spanish dub.

Notes

References

External links 
  on CBBC
  on Family
 

Episode list using the default LineColor
2010s American animated television series
2020s American animated television series
2010s French animated television series
2019 American television series debuts
2019 Irish television series debuts
2019 French television series debuts
CBBC shows
American children's animated comedy television series
French children's animated comedy television series
American flash animated television series
French flash animated television series
English-language television shows
Animated television series about cats
Animated television series about dogs
Animated television series about mice and rats
Animated television series about siblings